Caraá is a municipality in the state of Rio Grande do Sul, Brazil where Rio dos Sinos' river rises. It was originally part of the city Santo Antônio da Patrulha, emancipated on December 28, 1995.

History 
First inhabitants of Caraá were the indigenous that gave name to the place. Caraá is a type of bamboo that was very abundant in there.

See also
List of municipalities in Rio Grande do Sul

References

Municipalities in Rio Grande do Sul